Saruq may refer to:
 Saruq, Markazi, Iran
 Saruq, Razavi Khorasan, Iran
 Saruq District, in Iran
 Saruq Rural District (disambiguation), in Iran
 Saruq, Oman